Chupanan (also Romanized as Chūpānān) is a village in Chupanan Rural District, Anarak District, Nain County, Isfahan Province, Iran. At the 2006 census, its population was 1,485, in 421 families.

References 

Populated places in Nain County